Atzmon, formerly known as Segev, is a community settlement in Gush Segev in the Galilee, part of the Misgav Regional Council.

History
After the establishment of Israel in 1948, the Jewish National Fund initiated the establishment of "working villages" to providing housing and employment for the large influx of new immigrants. Segev was founded in 1957 as one of these villages. In the early years of its existence, residents of Segev were employed in building roads and forestry work. They planted the Segev forest, which today covers both sides of Highway 805, from Yavor junction to the Misgav services center.

Misgav High School, a regional high school that accepts students from all communities in the Misgav region, is located in Atzmon.

See also
List of forests in Israel

References

External links
Town website
Misgav Regional Council 

Community settlements
Misgav Regional Council
Populated places in Northern District (Israel)